Tim Duncan (born 1976) is an American former professional basketball player.

Tim Duncan may also refer to:
Tim Duncan (American football) (born 1979), American football player
Tim A. Duncan, English composer
Tim Duncan, singer in the Southern gospel quartet Ernie Haase & Signature Sound